Timothy Andrew Tweats (born 18 April 1974) is a former English cricketer. He was a right-handed batsman and a right-arm medium-pace bowler who played for Derbyshire between 1992 and 1999, and for Staffordshire in 2000.

As a youth, Tweats was a promising footballer, spending time in Port Vale's youth system.

He made his debut for Derbyshire in a loss against Glamorgan, though, playing as a lower-middle order batsman, he barely disgraced himself, being caught at 24.

He did not play first-class cricket again until the 1995 season, spending all of 1993 and a significant portion of 1994 in the Second XI. A slow starter upon his return, he excelled in the 1997 season, where he hit his debut first-class century, before making a career-best score of 189, and finishing high in the batting averages for the season. During his high-scoring innings, Kim Barnett partnered him to a county record second-wicket stand of 417, a record which stands to this day.

Tweats retired from First-class cricket at the end of the 1999 season to focus on higher education.

In 2000 Tweats played for Staffordshire.

References

External links
Tim Tweats at Cricket Archive 

1974 births
Living people
English cricketers
Derbyshire cricketers
Staffordshire cricketers